The Help Machine is the seventh studio album by American rock band Fastball.

Background
Produced by Steve Berlin of Los Lobos, Berlin personally selected the tracks for the album from a list of songs provided to him by Tony Scalzo and Miles Zuniga. Berlin recruited bassist Bruce Hughes to play bass, reuniting Hughes with band, and allowing him to take over bass duties from Scalzo. This freed Scalzo to concentrate on keyboards and guitar.

This album marks the first time since The Harsh Light of Day that a Fastball album does not feature songs co-written by Scalzo and Zuniga.

The first single off of the album, The Help Machine, addresses the effects of consumerism. According to Zuniga, "[the song is] just about emptiness and the feeling that things that are supposed to make us happy don't."

Critical reception
Described as "ethereal", the album also features the band's signature sound with comparisons to Elvis Costello and the Beatles. Pop Matters magazine referred to the album as "pop perfection." The album features a "thick modern sound" and is considered to be a great introduction to the band's catalog. Critics called the album "near perfect" and considered it one of the best albums of 2019.

To support the album, Tony Scalzo and Miles Zuniga performed live tracks for Paste Magazine.

Track listing 
 "Friend Or Foe" (Miles Zuniga) – 3:56
 "White Collar" (Tony Scalzo) – 3:31
 "Holding The Devil's Hand" (Miles Zuniga) – 3:12
 "Redeemed" (Miles Zuniga) – 3:04
 "All Gone Fuzzy" (Tony Scalzo) – 3:17
 "The Help Machine" (Miles Zuniga) – 4:14
 "Surprise Surprise" (Miles Zuniga) – 3:32
 "The Girl You Pretended To Be" (Tony Scalzo) – 2:18
 "I Go South" (Miles Zuniga) – 2:31
 "Doesn't It Make You Feel Small" (Tony Scalzo) – 2:56
 "Never Say Never" (Miles Zuniga) – 3:11

Personnel
 Tony Scalzo – vocals, bass guitar, keyboards, guitar
 Miles Zuniga – vocals, guitar
 Joey Shuffield – drums, percussion
Guest musicians
 Andy Steck – drums, wurlitzer, juno (track 6), e-bow, piano (track 1)
 Bruce Hughes – bass guitar, additional vocals
 Charlie Sexton – guitar (track 8)
 Gordy Quist – additional vocals
 John Chipman – drums (track 1)
 Kevin McKinney – guitar (track 10)
 Steve Berlin – percussion

References 

2019 albums
Fastball (band) albums